The Pakistan national cricket team toured Sri Lanka in August and September 1994, outside the normal cricket season, for a three-match Test series and five Limited Overs International matches. Pakistan won the Test series 2–0.

Test series summary

1st Test

2nd Test

3rd Test

ODI series

1st ODI

2nd ODI

3rd ODI

4th ODI

5th ODI

References

External links
 Pakistan in Sri Lanka ODI Series, 1994
 Pakistan in Sri Lanka Test Series, 1994

1994 in Pakistani cricket
1994 in Sri Lankan cricket
International cricket competitions from 1991–92 to 1994
1994
Sri Lankan cricket seasons from 1972–73 to 1999–2000